Klaes Karppinen (also spelled Klaus; 9 October 1907 – 24 January 1992) was a Finnish cross-country skier who competed in the 1930s. He won a gold medal at the 1936 Winter Olympics in Garmisch-Partenkirchen in the 4 × 10 km relay. Karppinen was born in Iisalmi, Finland.

Karppinen's biggest successes were at the Nordic skiing World Championships where he earned 10 medals, including five golds (18 km: 1935, 4 × 10 km relay: 1934, 1935, 1938, 1939) and five silvers (18 km: 1939; 50 km: 1935, 1937, 1939; and 4 × 10 km relay: 1937).

Cross-country skiing results
All results are sourced from the International Ski Federation (FIS).

Olympic Games
 1 medal – (1 gold)

World Championships
 10 medals – (5 gold, 5 silver)

References

External links
 
 
 

1907 births
1992 deaths
People from Iisalmi
Finnish male cross-country skiers
Cross-country skiers at the 1936 Winter Olympics
Olympic medalists in cross-country skiing
FIS Nordic World Ski Championships medalists in cross-country skiing
Medalists at the 1936 Winter Olympics
Olympic gold medalists for Finland
Sportspeople from North Savo